Jimmy Maelen (March 26, 1940 – January 14, 1988) was an American percussionist from the 1960s to 1980s, who worked with many artists including Roxy Music, Bryan Ferry, Peter Gabriel, James Taylor, Dire Straits, Barry Manilow, Alice Cooper, Kiss, Madonna, Bryan Adams, Michael Jackson, Mick Jagger, David Bowie and John Lennon.  He also played on hit records by Bob James, Duran Duran, Carly Simon, Barbra Streisand, Yoko Ono, Meatloaf, Alice Cooper, BJ Thomas, and many others.

Barely out of junior high school, his first group was a doo-wop street corner quintet called the Velons. By the early 1960s, he had become an excellent percussionist, playing almost exclusively with Latin bands around New York.

Maelen became lead singer, percussionist and founding member of Ambergris, and played with them for a few years. For the next two or three years, he worked with several bands and did session work. By the mid 1970s, his career took off.

For most of the late 1970s into the 1980s he was one of the "first call" percussion players in New York City. During the golden years of the disco era he was especially successful, working with the remix team of Michael Barbiero and John Luongo and overdubbing on extended dance versions of disco classics such as Gonzales' "I Haven't Stopped Dancin' Yet", The Jacksons' "Blame It on the Boogie" and "Shake Your Body (Down to the Ground)", Dan Hartman's "Vertigo/Relight My Fire", Jackie Moore's "This Time Baby" and many more.  He can be heard playing seven tracks of percussion on Barry Manilow's classic hit "Copacabana". As a percussionist, he also appeared on the album, Desire Wire, made from 1978, done by Cindy Bullens. His working relationship with Barbiero and Luongo led to a solo album for Epic/Columbia in 1980, produced by the trio and entitled Beats Workin.

Maelen's first album with Roxy Music was the critically acclaimed Avalon. He also played on the Dire Straits Brothers in Arms album, and appeared with both Roxy Music and Dire Straits at Live Aid in London. He also toured with Peter Gabriel on his first solo tour in 1977.

Maelen worked as a studio musician on Alphaville's 1986 album, Afternoons in Utopia. At the time of his death he was producing his first rock band Cherri Red, along with Gary Chester at the Edison Recording Studio in New York City. Subsequently, one of the songs "Be With You Tonight" which was written by John Bussi, was used in the film See You in the Morning directed by Alan J. Pakula.

Maelen died of leukemia on January 14, 1988. He was 47 years old.

Discography

Solo album
 Beats Workin (1980)With Bryan Adams You Want It You Got It (A&M, 1981)With Peter Allen I Could Have Been a Sailor (A&M, 1979)With Alphaville Afternoons in Utopia (Atlantic, 1986)With Irene Cara Anyone Can See (Network, 1982)With Linda Clifford I'll Keep on Loving You (Capitol, 1982)With Jude Cole Jude Cole (Reprise Records, 1987)With Mink DeVille Coup de Grâce (Atlantic, 1981)With Karla DeVito Is This a Cool World or What? (Epic, 1981)With Dion DiMucci Return of the Wanderer (Lifesong, 1978)With Duran Duran Notorious (EMI, 1986)With Bryan Ferry Boys and Girls (E.G., 1985)With Roberta Flack Blue Lights in the Basement (Atlantic, 1977)With Peter Gabriel Peter Gabriel (Atco, 1977)With Gloria Gaynor Experience Gloria Gaynor (MGM, 1975)
 Glorious (Polydor, 1977)With Debbie Gibson Out of the Blue (Atlantic, 1987)With Steve Goodman Say It in Private (Asylum Records, 1977)With Amy Grant Never Alone (Myrrh, 1980)With Gwen Guthrie Portrait (Island, 1983)
 Good to Go Lover (Polydor, 1986)With Hall & Oates X-Static (RCA, 1979)
 Private Eyes (RCA, 1981)With Dan Hartman Relight My Fire (Blue Sky, 1979)With Loleatta Holloway Love Sensation (Goldon Mind, 1980)With Janis Ian Janis Ian (Columbia Records, 1978)
 Night Rains (Columbia Records, 1979)With Garland Jeffreys Escape Artist (Epic, 1981)
 Guts for Love (Epic, 1983)With Al Johnson Peaceful (Marina Records, 1978)With Kiss Love Gun (Casablanca, 1977)With Ben E. King Save the Last Dance for Me (EMI, 1987)With John Lennon and Yoko Ono Milk and Honey (Polydor, 1984)With O'Donel Levy Windows (Groove Merchant, 1976)With Nils Lofgren Wonderland (MCA, 1983)With Barry Manilow Barry Manilow (Bell, 1973)
 Tryin' to Get the Feeling (Arista, 1975)
 Even Now (Arista, 1978)
 Barry (Arista, 1980)With Barry Mann Lay It Out (CBS, 1971)With Jimmy McGriff The Mean Machine (Groove Merchant, 1976)
 Red Beans (Groove Merchant, 1976)
 Tailgunner (LRC, 1977)With Frankie Miller Dancing in the Rain (Mercury, 1986)With Stephanie Mills If I Were Your Woman (MCA, 1987)With Roxy Music Flesh and Blood (Reprise, 1980)
 Avalon (Polydor, 1982)With Laura Nyro Smile (Columbia, 1976)With Odyssey I Got the Melody (RCA, 1981)
 Happy Together (RCA, 1982)With Yoko Ono It's Alright (I See Rainbows) (Rykodisc, 1982)With Leslie Pearl Words & Music (RCA, 1982)With Vicki Sue Robinson Vicki Sue Robinson (RCA Victor, 1976)With Jennifer Rush Heart over Mind (CBS, 1987)With Helen Schneider Let It Be Now (RCA Records, 1978)With Neil Sedaka A Song (Elektra, 1977)With Marlena Shaw Take a Bite (Columbia, 1979)With Carly Simon Coming Around Again (Arista, 1987)With Lonnie Smith Keep on Lovin' (Groove Merchant, 1976)With Lonnie Liston Smith Silhouettes (Doctor Jazz, 1984)With Bert Sommer Bert Sommer (Capitol, 1977)With Billy Squier Signs of Life (Capitol, 1984)With Dire Straits Brothers in Arms (Vertigo, 1985)With Barbra Streisand Emotion (Columbia, 1984)With James Taylor That's Why I'm Here (Columbia, 1985)With Bonnie Tyler Faster Than the Speed of Night (Columbia Records, 1983)With Frankie Valli Closeup (Private Stock, 1976)With Kenny Vance Short Vacation (Gold Castle, 1988)With Village People Fox on the Box (Metronome, 1982)With Loudon Wainwright III'''
 T Shirt'' (Arista, 1976)

1940 births
1988 deaths
Deaths from leukemia
American percussionists
Male pop singers
20th-century American male singers
20th-century American singers
Place of birth missing
Nationality missing
Place of death missing
The Group with No Name members